Katherine Choy (1927–1958) was an American artist, known for her work with ceramics and pottery.

Personal Life 
She was born into an affluent family in Hong Kong in 1927, and in 1946, Choy went to study in the United States, first at Wesleyan College in Macon, Georgia. In 1948 she transferred to Mills College to be near family in California, earning her bachelor's degree in 1950 and a master's degree in 1951. In 1952, she became the head of the ceramics department at the Newcomb College at Tulane University in New Orleans and in 1957 started the Clay Art Center in Port Chester, NY. She unexpectedly passed away at a young age in 1958.

Her ceramics were traditionally thrown on the wheel but she experimented with bold patterns and a unique palette. Her early pots were inspired by Asian clay traditions; but she eventually moved towards more innovative and modern techniques, setting her apart from her peers.

Exhibits 
In 1953, Choy had a solo exhibit at the New Orleans Museum of Art (formerly known as the Delgado Museum) titled Ceramics by Katherine Choy, and had her work featured in the Designer Craftsmen U.S.A. 1953 exhibition, organized by the American Craft Council. She has also had her works shown at institutions including the Brooklyn Museum, the Art Institute of Chicago, and The San Francisco Museum of Art. In 2022, she has her first exhibit at NOMA, titled "Katherine Choy: Radical Potter in 1950s New Orleans." This exhibit was her first since her friends held The Katherine Choy Memorial Show at the Orleans Gallery in 1959.

References 

1927 births
1957 deaths
American artists
20th-century American artists
Women ceramists